The Aydlett A-1 was a one-off, homebuilt aircraft constructed in the US in the 1960s.  It was a single seat, single engine monoplane of conventional appearance, with an enclosed cockpit.

Design and development

Donald Aydlett began construction of the sole A-1 in 1963, flying it on 6 July 1965.  It was a low wing monoplane of mixed wood and steel construction.  The wing was a fabric covered wood structure, with streamlined lift struts from the upper fuselage longerons.  The fuselage and tail unit were steel, again fabric covered, and the tail unit was wire braced.  The tailplane was on top of the fuselage; the rounded fin carried a generous, unbalanced rudder. The cockpit, over the wing, was enclosed by a canopy which merged at the rear with the raised fuselage decking.  Power came from a 125 hp (93 kW) flat four Lycoming O-290-G, mounted with cylinder heads and exhaust pipes exposed.  The A-1 had a fixed, conventional undercarriage, with mainwheels mounted on faired V-struts and a tailwheel.

Specifications

References

1960s United States sport aircraft
Low-wing aircraft
Aircraft first flown in 1965